Benno Werlen (born 10 October 1952) is a Swiss geographer who is known for his action-centered approach to human geography and his concept of a Geography of Everyday Regionalizations.

Werlen currently holds the UNESCO-Chair on Global Understanding for Sustainability at the Friedrich Schiller University, Jena (Germany). From 1998 to 2018, he held the chair of social geography at Jena University. Werlen was a visiting professor at the Universities of Salzburg, Geneva and Nijmegen as well as a visiting scholar at the University of Cambridge, the London School of Economics, and the University of California, Los Angeles. He has served as a panel member for the European Research Council from 2008-15, and for the French National Research Agency (ANR) in the field of Social and human sciences from 2008-12. From 2004-2016, he chaired the International Geographical Union’s commission "Cultural approach in geography", and since 2016, Werlen has been heading the commission "Global understanding".

In 2016, Werlen received the International Geographical Union’s Lauréat d’Honneur for his lifetime achievements and his efforts for the "2016 International Year of Global Understanding".

Early life and education 
Werlen was born in Münster, Valais on October 10, 1952. He attended the École Normal at Sion and completed a first university degree (1973-76) in German and French literature and geography. From 1976 to 1980 he studied geography, ethnology, sociology and economics at the Université de Fribourg (Switzerland). In 1980, he graduated with the "License Faculté des Lettres". After working with Dietrich Bartels in the early 1980s at the University of Kiel he earned his PhD in 1985 from the University of Fribourg. In 1994, he received his venia legendi from the Faculty of Natural Sciences at the University of Zurich (Switzerland) where he was lecturing as a senior scientist from 1983-1997. He was also a visiting lecturer at the Swiss Federal Institute of Technology (ETH) from 1988 to 1998.

Research 
Werlen’s theoretical work centers on the construction of the social world through everyday-practices. In geography, he is best-known for his action-centered approach and the concept of Everyday Regionalizations. In his works, he argues for a theoretical turn from ‘space’ to ‘action’ in human geography, connecting the discipline closer to the social and cultural sciences. In German-speaking Human geography, Werlen is thus seen as one of the most important reformers since the mid-1980s, and one of the most influential authors of his generation.

Action-centered Social geography 
On the basis of earlier works on the theoretical development of geography, Werlen developed an action-theoretical approach to human geography from the mid-1980s on. In his 1987 book Gesellschaft, Handlung und Raum, published in 1993 as Society, Action and Space, Werlen rejected the idea of human geography being a spatial science that primarily describes the geographical distribution of social phenomena. Instead, the book argued in favor of treating space as an element of human actions. Consequently, Werlen critically examined the classics of sociological action theory, such as Vilfredo Pareto, Max Weber, Talcott Parsons, or Alfred Schütz, and developed an approach that highlights different aspects of everyday actions and their spatial implications. Space, according to Werlen’s action-centered approach, is not given but produced in everyday actions.

Social geography of everyday regionalizations 
In his most significant contribution to German-speaking geography, the three-volume Sozialgeographie alltäglicher Regionalisierungen (Social Geography of Everyday Regionalizations), Werlen transformed the action-theoretical approach towards a more encompassing theory, based on a critical analysis and enhancement of Anthony Giddens’s Theory of Structuration. In the two first volumes, Werlen takes up Giddens’s notion of ‘everyday regionalization’ and detaches the idea from a Newtonian concept of space. Following the constructivist idea of ‘geography-making’, the approach emphasizes the everyday constitution of space as a result of social practices and routines. Werlen suggests distinguishing different dimensions of these practices, such as economic, normative, or communicative, which produce different kinds of space or spatial relationships. These distinctions, according to Werlen, also provide the basis for practice-centered approaches to economic, political, and cultural geography.

His Social Geography of Everyday Regionalizations sparked great debate in German-speaking human geography from the mid-1990s on. His rejection of traditional geography’s obsession with space and the plea for rooting the discipline in the social and cultural sciences antagonized more conservative branches of German-speaking geography, who feared the loss of the discipline’s classic themes and core competencies. Furthermore, controversies about an overemphasis of individualism and intentionality, and the neglect of structural determinants in Werlen’s theory emerged.

Despite criticism from within geography, his concept helped to pave the way for a cultural turn in German-speaking geography and contributed to an interdisciplinary debate on space and the spatial dimension in the social sciences. Werlen’s critique of the social sciences’ new interest in space, however, was rejected by leading authors of the spatial turn in German-speaking sociology.

Societal relationships with space and sustainability research 
In the early 2010s, Werlen introduced the concept of "Societal Relationships With Space" ("Gesellschaftliche Raumverhältnisse") into geographical theory and began to investigate questions of sustainability. Advancing the approach developed in his Social Geography of Everyday Regionalizations, Werlen argued for a historical use of practice-centered perspectives and proposed to investigate long-term change in society-space relationships. His concept of ‘mastering’ the spatiality of everyday-life intends to shed light on the historically established geographical conditions of acting, and the mechanisms of change in the geographical logic of everyday-practices. Despite many links to historical geography and historical sciences, however, the concept has received little attention compared to Werlen’s former contributions.

In a 2015 edited volume on Global Sustainability, Werlen argued for a stronger integration of the social and the natural sciences in sustainability research and introduced the concept of "global understanding" to sustainability science. According to Werlen, sustainable development requires a greater awareness and understanding of the global embeddedness of local living conditions, and a rejection of simplistic notions of science transforming its insights into society.

The International Year of Global Understanding 
Werlen is the founder and executive director of the International Geographical Union’s Initiative for an "International Year of Global Understanding". The international year was approved by the General Conference of UNESCO in November 2013 and proclaimed for 2016 by the three major science councils of the human (CIPSH), social (ISSC) and natural sciences (ICSU).

See also 
 Globalization
 Human geography
 Social geography
 Sustainability

Selected Bibliography

Monographs 
 Werlen, Benno (1987). Gesellschaft, Handlung und Raum: Grundlagen handlungstheoretischer Sozialgeographie. Stuttgart: Franz Steiner Verlag. [Society, Action and Space: The Fundamentals of Action Theory in Social Geography]
 Werlen, Benno (1993). Society, Action and Space: An Alternative Human Geography. London: Routledge.
 Werlen, Benno (1995). Sozialgeographie alltäglicher Regionalisierungen Vol. 1: Zur Ontologie von Gesellschaft und Raum. Stuttgart: Franz Steiner Verlag. [Social Geography of Everyday Regionalizations Vol. 1: On the Ontology of Society and Space]
 Werlen, Benno (1997). Sozialgeographie alltäglicher Regionalisierungen Vol. 2: Globalisierung, Region und Regionalisierung. Stuttgart: Franz Steiner Verlag. [Social Geography of Everyday Regionalizations. Vol. 2: Globalization, Region and Regionalization]
 Werlen, Benno (2000). Sozialgeographie: Eine Einführung. Bern: UTB Haupt. [Social Geography: An Introduction]
 Werlen, Benno (2010). Gesellschaftliche Räumlichkeit Vol. 1: Orte der Geographie. Stuttgart: Franz Steiner Verlag. [Places of Geography: Collected Papers Vol. 1]
 Werlen, Benno (2010). Gesellschaftliche Räumlichkeit Vol. 2: Konstruktion geographischer Wirklichkeiten. Stuttgart: Franz Steiner Verlag. [Places of Geography: Collected Papers Vol. 2]

References 

Swiss geographers
1952 births
Living people